The year 1964 in archaeology involved some significant events.

Excavations
 Seibal Harvard University project begins under direction of Gordon R. Willey and A. Ledyard Smith.
 Et-Tell excavations under Joseph Callaway begin (continue through 1970).
 Saqqara excavations under Bryan Emery begin (continue through 1971).
 Pool of Bethesda excavations.
 Snaketown by Emil Haury, with assistance from E. B. Sayles, Erik K. Reed, and Irwin and Julian Hayden.
 Ebla excavations by the University of Rome La Sapienza directed by Paolo Matthiae begin.
 Excavations in Hane, Marquesas Islands, by Yosihiko H. Sinoto begin.
 Tomb of Princess Yongtai excavated in Qianling Mausoleum, China.
 The Missione Archaeologica Italiana a Malta begins excavations at Ras il-Wardija, Gozo, Malta (continues through 1967).
 First full-scale excavation of Roman villa at Oplontis in Italy begins.
 Archaeological site of Atapuerca in Spain directed by Francisco Jordá Cerdá.
 Argentine surveyor and archaeologist Carlos J. Gradin and his team begins the most profound research on Cueva de las Manos in a 30-year-long study of the caves and their art.
 Excavation of Tel Arad by Yohanan Aharoni (continues until 1967).

Finds

 Getty Victorious Youth in the sea off Fano.
 The second trove of Qabala treasures in Azerbaijan.
 Mummies on Pichu Pichu in the Peruvian Andes.
 Teeth from Grotta del Cavallo in southern Italy, identified in 2011 as the oldest known remains of European early modern humans.
 Pyrgi Tablets at the site of ancient Pyrgi in Lazio, Italy.
 A buckle depicting a man holding a spear in each hand was discovered at Finglesham Anglo-Saxon cemetery during excavations led by Sonia Chadwick Hawkes.

Events
 April 24 – The Swedish warship Vasa, sunk in 1628, is raised from the waters of Stockholm harbor.
 May 31 – The Venice Charter for the Conservation and Restoration of Monuments and Sites is adopted by the Second International Congress of Architects and Specialists of Historic Buildings.
 November 30 – Western Australian Museum Act Amendment Act provides for protection of pre-1900 wrecks in local waters.
 Project to move the Abu Simbel temples to prevent their inundation by the Aswan High Dam begins.

Publications
 L. Sprague de Camp and Catherine Crook de Camp - Ancient Ruins and Archaeology.
 Journal of Industrial Archaeology begins publication.

Awards
 Ian Richmond knighted.

Births
 February – Duan Qingbo, Chinese archaeologist (died 2019)

Deaths

References

Archaeology
Archaeology, 1964 In
Archaeology by year
Archaeology, 1964 In